Felsite Island is a rock island  long and  high, lying at the head of Edisto Inlet within the northward stream of Edisto Glacier. It was named by the New Zealand Geological Survey Antarctic Expedition, 1957–58, as descriptive of several prominent dikes of cream-colored igneous rocks (felsite) in its otherwise dark sedimentary rock formation.

See also 
 List of antarctic and sub-antarctic islands

References 

Islands of Victoria Land
Borchgrevink Coast